The Alesbury was an Irish automobile.  It was powered by an 8/10hp Stevens-Duryea engine and had solid tires.  The car was exhibited in Dublin in 1907, but manufacture lasted only from then until 1908.

References
Georgano, G.N., "Alesbury", in G.N. Georgano, ed., The Complete Encyclopedia of Motorcars 1885-1968  (New York: E.P. Dutton and Co., 1974), pp. 33.

Brass Era vehicles
Cars of Ireland

Duryea